Elitzur Ashkelon was a professional basketball team based in Ashkelon in south-west Israel. The team reached the quarterfinals of the EuroCup Challenge in 2006 and also won the 2006 League Cup.

Honours
Israeli League Cup
Winners (1): 2006

Notable former players

 Erez Markovich
 Terry Acox
 CJ Bruton
 Steve Burtt Jr.
 Marcus Hatten
 Paul Jones
 Andrius Jurkūnas
 Wendell McKines
 Andrae Patterson
 Gabe Pruitt
 Omar Sneed

References

Defunct basketball teams in Israel
Sport in Ashkelon
Israeli Basketball Premier League teams
2002 establishments in Israel
2017 disestablishments in Israel